Brookfield is a Canadian community located on the northeast coast of the island of Newfoundland in the province of Newfoundland and Labrador.

Situated near Wesleyville, it was formerly named Norton's Cove but was changed in 1879 when Captain Abram Kean and his family of nine moved there and renamed it Brookfield. Norton's Cove was settled after 1874 and by 1891 had a population of 147 people; in 1911 the population had grown to 372. The community has since been incorporated into the new municipality of New-Wes-Valley, along with several other former villages.

Church History
In 1891, 138 of the 147 inhabitants in Brookfield were Methodist. Therefore, in 1889 the people of Brookfield began building a church. It was completed and dedicated in July 1891 by Rev. James Nurse. The church could accommodate almost 200 people and it had a separate area for day and Sunday school. In 1905 a decision was made to build a separate school because the church was no longer large enough for the growing population. Money was being raised since 1891 and with it they renovated their church to make it larger. Ebenezer United Church is still in use in 2008.

Captain Abram Kean
Captain Abram Kean is one of Newfoundlands most famous sealing captains. He set a record for the most seal pelts at 1,052,737 during his career. Altogether he commanded nine steamers: The Wolf, Hope, Aurora, Terra Nova, Florizel, Stephano, Nascopie, Thetis, and Beothic II. He also set a record for most seals brought in from one voyage in 1910 with 49,069 pelts which was beaten in 1933 by a Captain Albert Blackwood.

Interesting facts

 Captain Abram Kean's nephew, Job Kean, lived in Brookfield and was a captain on many sealing steamers between 1896 and 1917.  Job and wife Virtue (Hann), and later their youngest son Baxter Wesley Kean ran a general store in brookfield from around 1890 until 1979.  The Job Kean Shop was designated a historic structure by the Heritage Foundation of Newfoundland and Labrador in 1988.
 In the 1880s, the Bonavista District Ouport Road Boards for the area of Norton's Cove to Pound Cove was represented by Tiller, Bishop, Biddlecombe, Gibbons, Blackwood, Bishop, and Hounsel.

See also
 List of communities in Newfoundland and Labrador

References

External links
 
 http://www.famouscanadians.net/name/k/keanabram.php

Populated places in Newfoundland and Labrador